Valinokkam is a village in Ramanathapuram district in Tamil Nadu. Because it is near the seashore, Valinokkam is famous for salt production. The Tamil Nadu Salt corporation started Salt production from Valinokkam in the year 1974. It is also well known for the shrine of Imraan Ummayah Al Badawiyyah shaheed and Sulthan Abdul Qadir Popularly called as Peer Muhammad, Noor Muhammad waliyullah Dargah by the local people.

Village
The village is situated on a peninsula. This village is peaceful and cover of nature in Gulf of Mannar. Hence, it played an essential role in the ancient wars which occurred in the region. An aesthetically pleasing Masjid is said to have been constructed by Jinns, which was originally constructed by Vavwali Naina Mohamed marraicayar of kilakarai (grandfather of vallal seethakathi marraikayar) who build many stone masjids in sea shore area of Kerala, Tamil Nadu and andhra he built many masjid in cylone also which resembles by his own symbol embossed in those masjid which was very clearly shown in his tomb (old jumma masjid oldest masjid of India) in Kilakarai ;

Facilities of this village 
1. 24 hours (PHC) Government Hospital for treatment This village hospital is useful to approximately surrounding of 6 villages. But the (PHC) doesn't have proper treatment.

2. 24 hours available for tourist travels (car, minivan, tata venture and mahindra tourister)

3. Dhodhal Halwa, Fish & Sea foods etc...... famous.

4. All type of online services available in R.S.R communication and Xerox....

5. There are two legal sunnath jamaath masjid approved by Tamil Nadu Wakf Board....

References

Villages in Ramanathapuram district
Sufi shrines in India
Ziyarat
Dargahs in Tamil Nadu
Erwadi-related dargahs